George Murrell Smith Jr. (born May 15, 1968) is an American politician and the 61st Speaker of the South Carolina House of Representatives.

Born in Florence, South Carolina, Smith spent the majority of his childhood Sumter, South Carolina, where he attended Wilson Hall School. He graduated in 1986 and enrolled at Wofford College, where he completed his B.A. in Forms of Government in 1990. After earning his J.D. from the University of South Carolina School of Law in 1993, Smith began practicing law in his hometown of Sumter: first as a public defender and later as partner at Lee, Erter, Wilson, Holler & Smith, LLC.

He was elected to the South Carolina House of Representatives from the 67th District in 2001, and has held this seat since. He is a member of the Republican Party. On December 5, 2018, Smith was appointed by Speaker of the House Jay Lucas as chairman of the House Ways and Means Committee. Smith previously served as chairman of the Health and Human Services Subcommittee and has sat on the House Ways and Means Committee since 2009.

In April 2022, he was elected unanimously by the House to succeed Jay Lucas as Speaker of the House of Representatives. He assumed office on May 12, 2022.

References

1968 births
21st-century American politicians
Living people
Republican Party members of the South Carolina House of Representatives
Speakers of the South Carolina House of Representatives